The Russian National Music Award (abbr. RNMA), also known as Russian Music Award, (abbr. RMA) (abbr. РМП) or Victoria Award is a music award, established in 2015 by the Academy of Russian Music, to recognise the talent and achievements in the Russian popular and classical music scene.

The nominees and winners are chosen by a jury consisting of members of the Academy of Russian Music. The Russian National Music Award is considered the Russian equivalent to the Grammy Award.

History 
The award was established in 2015 by the Academy of Russian Music and its president Yuri Kostin,(ru) following an initiative of Russian music industry grand Mikhail Gutseriev. The aim was to establish a professional, objective, impartial award to recognise achievements in the Russian music scene. According to its organisers, their goal is to be "the most objective music award in Russia".

The award ceremony is held annually in December, in Moscow, and broadcast on Russia-1.

Award ceremonies have been held on

 10 December 2015 (Live broadcast on Russia-1 on 11 December 2015)
 7 December 2016 (broadcast on Russia-1 on 9 December 2016)
 13 December 2017 (broadcast on Russia-1 on 15 December 2017)
 7 December 2018 (broadcast on Russia-1 on 7 December 2018)
 5 December 2019 (broadcast on Russia-1 on 13 December 2019)

The first award ceremony, in 2015, took place in the Crocus City Hall, since then, the ceremony has been held in the State Kremlin Palace.

The ceremonies have been accompanied by live performances of renowned Russian, such as Polina Gagarina, Philipp Kirkorov, Nikolay Baskov, Dima Bilan, Sergey Lazarev, and Leonid Agutin,  and international artists, including Christina Aguilera, Alekseev, Svetlana Loboda, Ani Lorak and Dimash Kudaibergen.

The award ceremonies were hosted by Vera Brezhneva and Aleksandr Revva in 2015, Igor Vernik and Olga Shelest(ru) in 2016, Glukoza and Andrey Razygraev in 2017, and by Andrey Malakhov in 2018 and 2019.

Voting procedure 

The winners of the RNMAs are chosen by an expert jury, namely by the more than 150 members of the Academy of Russian Music, called "Academicians".

In the first round of the evaluation process, nominees are suggested by production centers, record labels and other professionals of the Russian music scene; but artists also have the possibility to apply themselves. Approximately a month before the award ceremony, the suggested nominees are announced at the Russian National Music Award Gala Dinner. With the gala dinner, the expert voting of the Academicians is officially launched.  Then, in an anonymous online voting, each Academy member can cast one vote in each category. At the end of November the voting traditionally closes, and in early December the top nominees who received the most Academician votes within each category are presented as "finalists" to the media. Then, the winners of the expert voting are revealed at the Russian National Music Award Ceremony.

The voting process is controlled by the British international audit and consulting company Ernst & Young that keeps the voting results a secret, even to the Academy and the event organisers themselves, until the winners are announced at the award ceremony.

The winners receive a diploma and a gold statuette called "Prima".

Categories 
The National Russian Music Award has been presented in the following (occasionally changing) categories:

 Best Male Singer in Popular Music
 Best Female Singer in Popular Music
 Best Vocalist in Classical Music
 Best Instrumentalist in Classical Music
 Composer of the Year
 Lyricist of the Year
 Song of the Year
 Music Video of the Year
 Newcomer of the Year in Popular Music
 Best Pop Group
 Best Folk Artist/Band
 Best Rock Artist/Band
 Best Electronic Project
 Best Hip Hop Project
 Urban Romance
 Best Soundtrack
 Dance Hit of the Year
 Best Concert
 Best Music TV Show
 Best Music Producer

Main category winners and finalists

Special prize winners

Award statistics

References

Russian music awards
Awards established in 2015
Recurring events established in 2015
2015 establishments in Russia